William Marshall Craig (died 1827) was an English painter who exhibited at times at the Royal Academy, from 1788 until 1827.

Craig first lived at Manchester, but settled in London about 1791. He was painter in water-colours to the Queen, and miniature painter to the Duke and Duchess of York. He also excelled as a draughtsman on wood, and as a book illustrator, and he published in 1821 'Lectures on Drawing, Painting, and Engraving.' He is said to have been a nephew of Thomson, the poet. 'The Wounded Soldier' by him is in the Water-Colour Gallery at the South Kensington Museum.

One of his pupils was the mouth-painter Sarah Biffen (1784–1850).

Notes

References
 

Year of birth unknown
1827 deaths
English watercolourists
Portrait miniaturists
English illustrators
Court painters